The WABA Champions Cup 2003 was the 6th staging of the WABA Champions Cup, the basketball club tournament of West Asia Basketball Association. The tournament was held in Tehran, Iran between June 11 and June 13. The winner qualify for the Asian Basketball Confederation Champions Cup 2003.

Standings

Results

External links
www.asia-basket.com

References
 1st day results
 2nd day results
 3rd day results

2003
International basketball competitions hosted by Iran
2002–03 in Asian basketball
2002–03 in Jordanian basketball
2002–03 in Iranian basketball